Vitor Baptista (born 20 March 1998) is a Brazilian racing driver.

Career

Karting
Prior to his single-seater career, Baptista enjoyed a successful period in karting in his native Brazil. He won consecutive Super Kart Brazil junior titles in 2011 and 2012 and also finished second in the Brazilian Karting Championship junior class in 2011. He also went on to finish seventh in the CIK-FIA KF3 World Cup in 2012.

Formula Three
Baptista made his single-seater debut in 2014, racing in the B Class of the Brazilian Formula Three Championship for the Cesário F3 team. He won the championship comfortably from compatriot Matheus Leist, earning thirteen class wins out of sixteen races whilst also taking three overall race victories.

For 2015, Baptista moved to Europe to compete in the Euroformula Open Championship, racing for reigning champions RP Motorsport. He secured the championship title at the final round of the season in Barcelona, finishing five points ahead of Russian Konstantin Tereshchenko after taking race victories at Paul Ricard, Estoril, Red Bull Ring, Spa-Francorchamps and Monza. He also finished second to Tereshchenko in the accompanying Spanish Formula Three Championship, which was held within the main championship at the Jerez, Estoril and Barcelona rounds.

Formula V8 3.5
Baptista will continue to race for RP Motorsport in 2016, graduating to Formula V8 3.5.

Racing record

Career summary

† As Baptista was a guest driver, he was ineligible to score points.

Complete Formula V8 3.5 Series results
(key) (Races in bold indicate pole position) (Races in italics indicate fastest lap)

Complete Stock Car Brasil results

† As Baptista was a guest driver, he was ineligible to score points.

References

External links

1998 births
Living people
Racing drivers from São Paulo
Brazilian racing drivers
Brazilian Formula Three Championship drivers
Euroformula Open Championship drivers
World Series Formula V8 3.5 drivers
Karting World Championship drivers
RP Motorsport drivers
Stock Car Brasil drivers